Fox Township occupies the 6 mile square on the western edge of Kendall County, Illinois. As of the 2010 census, its population was 1,675 and it contained 619 housing units. The township was named after the Fox River, which in turn was likely named after the Fox Tribe of southeastern Wisconsin.

It includes the villages of Millbrook and Millington.

Demographics

Government
The township is governed by an elected Town Board of a Supervisor and four Trustees.  The Township also has an elected Assessor, Clerk, Highway Commissioner and Supervisor.

References
 

Townships in Kendall County, Illinois
Townships in Illinois